Bechstein is a German surname. Notable people with the surname include:

Carl Bechstein, German piano manufacturer who founded C. Bechstein Pianofortefabrik
Edwin Bechstein (1859-1934), German piano manufacturer and son of Carl
Helene Bechstein (1876–1951), German socialite and businesswoman
Johann Matthäus Bechstein (1757–1822), German naturalist and forester
Ludwig Bechstein (1801–1860), German writer

German-language surnames

de:Bechstein